Rejepbaý Rejepow (born 23 February 1992) is a Turkmen weightlifter. He is a silver medalist at the 2017 World Weightlifting Championships in Anaheim, United States and the 2022 World Weightlifting Championships in Bogotá, Colombia. Rejepow is also a distinguished athlete of the State Migration Service of Turkmenistan. He competed in the men's 81 kg at the 2020 Summer Olympics held in Tokyo, Japan.

He won the gold medal in the men's 77 kg event at the 2017 Asian Indoor and Martial Arts Games held in Ashgabat, Turkmenistan.

Major results

References

Living people
1992 births
Turkmenistan male weightlifters
World Weightlifting Championships medalists
Weightlifters at the 2020 Summer Olympics
Olympic weightlifters of Turkmenistan
Weightlifters at the 2014 Asian Games
Asian Games competitors for Turkmenistan
Competitors at the 2013 Summer Universiade
21st-century Turkmenistan people